Moses Grant Jr. (July 25, 1785 - July 22, 1861) was a businessman born in Boston, Massachusetts, where he inherited his father's successful wallpaper business, selling English, French, American, and Cantonese wallpapers. He was a founder of the Massachusetts Bible Society, a Deacon at the Brattle Street Church, and President of the Boston Temperance Society.

He would frequently visit the Centre School in Dedham. He had charge of the Farm School on Thompson Island.

References

Works cited 
 Global Trade and Visual Arts in Federal New England, Patricia Johnston, Caroline Frank, University of New Hampshire Press, page 171, Nov 4, 2014.
 Massachusetts Bible Society biography
 Boston Public Library archives

Clergy from Boston
1785 births
1861 deaths